The Los Angeles version of the NWA World Tag Team Championship was the main tag team professional wrestling championship of the North American Wrestling Alliance, a member of the National Wrestling Alliance (NWA), which promoted shows in and around Los Angeles. The championship was the first of at least 17 championships to use that name between 1949 and 1992, as the NWA Board of Directors allowed each territory to create its own version of the NWA World Tag Team Championship if it  so desired. In 1957 there were at least 13 different versions of the NWA World Tag Team Championship recognized in the United States. Since it was a professional wrestling championship, it was not won through legitimate competitive matches, but instead determined by the decisions of the booker(s) of a wrestling promotion.

The first version of the Los Angeles NWA World Tag Team Championship was created in 1949, less than a year after the NWA itself was founded. At the time, tag team wrestling was popular on the West Coast, leading to the local NWA promoters Hugh Nichols and Johnny Doyle creating the first-ever NWA World Tag Team Championship when they announced The Dusek Family (Ernie and Emil Dusek) as the first champions on July 14, 1949. The NWA Board of Directors dictated that all NWA territories recognize only one NWA World Heavyweight Champion, but allowed each territory to crown its own world tag team champion, making each championship a regional championship despite the name. The Los Angeles territory promoted its NWA World Tag Team Championship for eleven years, with Ben and Mike Sharpe being the last champions of the era. The Duseks were the only team to hold the championship twice in that period of time. The longest reign of the first era belonged to Guy Brunetti and Joe Tangero, who held the championship for at least 277 days. After the Los Angeles version was abandoned, the local promoters recognized the San Francisco version in subsequent years.

By the 1970s the San Francisco territory had been taken over by Mike and Gene Lebell's NWA Hollywood Wrestling. In June 1970 the Twin Devils (two masked wrestlers identified only as Twin Devil #1 and Twin Devil #2) were billed as the NWA World Tag Team Champions. Records are not clear on how the Twin Devils became champions; since no records of a tournament have been found, it is possible they were simply awarded the championship when the Lebells decided to reintroduce the NWA World Tag Team Championship. Los Brazos (Spanish for "The Arms"; Brazo de Plata and Brazo de Oro) were the last holders of the championship as NWA Hollywood Wrestling closed in December 1982. From that point on, the NWA Mid-Atlantic version was the only active NWA Word Tag Team Championship left.

Title history
Key

Team reigns by combined length
Key

Individual reigns by combined length
Key

See also
National Wrestling Alliance
NWA World Tag Team Championship

Concurrent championships
Sources for 13 simultaneous NWA World Tag Team Championships
NWA World Tag Team Championship (Los Angeles version)
NWA World Tag Team Championship (San Francisco version)
NWA World Tag Team Championship (Central States version)
NWA World Tag Team Championship (Chicago version)
NWA World Tag Team Championship (Buffalo Athletic Club version)
NWA World Tag Team Championship (Georgia version)
NWA World Tag Team Championship (Iowa/Nebraska version)
NWA World Tag Team Championship (Indianapolis version)
NWA World Tag Team Championship (Salt Lake Wrestling Club version)
NWA World Tag Team Championship (Amarillo version)
NWA World Tag Team Championship (Minneapolis version)
NWA World Tag Team Championship (Texas version)
NWA World Tag Team Championship (Mid-America version)

Footnotes

References

National Wrestling Alliance championships
NWA Hollywood Wrestling championships
Tag team wrestling championships
World professional wrestling championships